Glenapp Castle, formerly the family seat of the Earl of Inchcape, is now a luxury hotel and restaurant located about  southeast of Ballantrae, South Ayrshire, Scotland.

History
The castle was built for the Deputy Lord Lieutenant of the County, James Hunter.  It has no older origin.  Designed by the famous Scottish architect David Bryce the Deputy Lord Lieutenant of Ayrshire at the time, the Castle was finished in 1870.  It is a noteworthy example of the Scottish Baronial style of architecture  The Inchcape family owned the castle from 1917 until the early 1980s. Pioneering aviator Elsie Mackay, daughter of the first Earl of Inchcape, lived at the castle until her untimely death in 1928 in an attempt to fly the Atlantic in a single engined Stinson Detroiter. The Castle opened as a hotel in 2000; entry to the castle and its grounds is only for guests with a room or restaurant reservation.

Location 
Glenapp Castle is near Ballantrae, Ayrshire and overlooks several islands: Ailsa Craig, Arran and Mull of Kintyre.  The site is also close to Galloway Forest Park, Mull of Galloway, Culzean Castle and several botanical gardens such as Logan Gardens, Castle Kennedy Gardens.  The actual castle and its buildings are almost  from the electronically gated entrance.

See also
 List of restaurants in Scotland

References

External links
 

Hotels in South Ayrshire
Restaurants in Scotland
Castles in South Ayrshire
Inventory of Gardens and Designed Landscapes
Category B listed buildings in South Ayrshire
1870 establishments in Scotland
Buildings and structures completed in 1870
Hotels established in 2000
2000 establishments in Scotland
Scottish baronial architecture